The Global Wind Energy Council (GWEC) was established in 2005 to provide a credible and representative forum for the entire wind energy sector at an international level.  GWEC’s mission is to ensure that wind power is established as one of the world’s leading energy sources, providing substantial environmental and economic benefits.

A new report launched by the Global Wind Energy Council predicts that, despite temporary supply chain difficulties, international wind markets are set to continue their strong growth.  In 2006, total installed wind power capacity increased by 25% globally, generating some €18 billion (US$23 billion) worth of new generating equipment and bringing global wind power capacity up to more than 74GW.  While the European Union is still the leading market in wind energy with over 48GW of installed capacity, other continents such as North America and Asia are developing quickly.

See also

 
World Wind Energy Association (WWEA)
List of large wind farms
Wind power in Denmark
Wind power in Germany
Wind power in Iran
Wind power in the United States
Climate change
Global warming
American Wind Energy Association
List of notable renewable energy organizations

References

External links
Official website GWEC
Global Wind Power Generated Record Year in 2006 
Global wind 2006 report 
GWEC Says Wind Boom will Continue
Global Wind Energy

bb

International renewable energy organizations
Wind power